Ilongot may refer to:
 Ilongot people, an ethnic group of Luzon, the Philippines
 Ilongot language, the Austronesian language spoken by them

See also 
 Ilongo people, an ethnic group of Mindanao and the Visayas, the Philippines
 Ilongo language
 Llongote, a mountain in Peru

Language and nationality disambiguation pages